Sodville is a dispersed rural community in San Patricio County, Texas near the intersections of Farm-to-market roads 1074 and 1944.

References

External links

Populated places in San Patricio County, Texas